Malsburg-Marzell is a municipality in the district of Lörrach in Baden-Württemberg in Germany. Its coat of arms bears a wooded hill on which rests a castle ruin. This is a reference to the nearby Sausenburg.

References

Lörrach (district)
Baden